Sarah binti Salleh Ab. Rahaman (Jawi: ساراه; born 9 April 1987) is the wife of the Crown Prince of Brunei, Al-Muhtadee Billah and born as the daughter of a distant member of the royal family. While attending a pre-university course at 17, she married the Crown Prince. The couple have four children.

Biography

Early life 
She was born Dayangku Sarah binti Pengiran Salleh Ab. Rahaman at Raja Isteri Pengiran Anak Saleha Hospital, Bandar Seri Begawan, as the third child and only daughter of Pengiran Salleh Ab-Rahaman Pengiran Damit and Dayang Rinawaty Abdullah (née Suzanne Aeby). Her father (born 1 June 1950) is a distant member of the royal family and worked as the chief laboratory assistant at the Water Services Division in the Public Works Department. Her mother (born 3 March 1954 in Fribourg, Switzerland) is a nurse who worked in Raja Isteri Pengiran Anak Saleha Hospital. Her parents met in the United Kingdom in the 1970s while studying.

Education 
Pengiran Anak Sarah attended St. Andrew's School from 1993 to 1998, and then Paduka Seri Begawan Sultan Science College, where she passed her O-levels in 2003. Al-Muhtadee Billah is also an alumnus of both schools. She pursued her pre-university education in the same college. She enrolled at Universiti Brunei Darussalam (UBD), where graduated with First Class Honours in October 2010 and received a Bachelor of Arts (BA) in Public Policy and Administration. She is also a military cadet at the university and top scorer in the netball team at the university. She was awarded a Book Prize  for her outstanding performances in the Bachelor of Arts (Public Policy and Administration), Year Three programme. She then further pursued her studies and graduated with a Master's Degree in Public Policy in English Medium during UBD’s 23rd Convocation in 2011.

Marriage and children
On 9 September 2004, while still attending Paduka Seri Begawan Sultan Science College, she married 30-year-old Al-Muhtadee Billah, the Crown Prince, at the age of 17. The event took place at Istana Nurul Iman. The ceremony, dubbed the "Asian wedding of the year," was attended by dignitaries including members of foreign royal families and heads of government. After the bersanding ceremony, the royal couple were driven in a gold open-topped Rolls-Royce across Bandar Seri Begawan, where they were greeted by crowds lining the streets.

The royal couple have four children. Their first child, a son, and future heir, Pengiran Muda Abdul Muntaqim, was born 17 March 2007 at the Raja Isteri Pengiran Anak Saleha Hospital. Their second child, a daughter, Pengiran Anak Muneerah Madhul Bolkiah, was born on 2 January 2011. Pengiran Anak Sarah gave birth to their third child and second son, Pengiran Muda Muhammad Aiman on 7 June 2015. Their fourth child and second daughter, Pengiran Anak Faathimah Az-Zahraa Raihaanul Bolkiah, was born on 1 December 2017.

Personal life 
Sarah's two elder brothers are Awangku Irwan and Awangku Adrian. She enjoys music, classical and modern theatre. Moreover, she enjoys playing basketball and participating in outdoor activities. She has participated in charity runs that her college has sponsored. During international four-wheel drive trips to Trans-Kalimantan-Java-Bali, Brunei-Sarawak-Kalimantan-Sulawesi, and Brunei-Hongkong-China-Mongolia, she has also traveled with her parents.

Legacy

Titles 
She is referred to by government media and English-language publications in the country as the wife of the Crown Prince, rather than Crown Princess (Puteri Mahkota). The title "Pengiran Anak Isteri" is given to the wife of a prince.

 9 April 1987 – 9 September 2004: 
 Since 9 September 2004:

Namesakes 

 Pengiran Anak Isteri Pengiran Anak Sarah Mosque, a mosque in Kampong Sungai Kelugos.

Honours

National 

  Order of Laila Utama First Class (DK) – Dato Laila Utama (15 July 2005)

Foreign 
 :
  Supreme Order of the Renaissance Grand Cordon – (13 May 2008)
 :
  Order of the Crown Grand Cross – (21 January 2013)

References

External links
 Fribourg

1987 births
Bruneian people of Swiss descent
Living people
Bruneian royalty
Recipients of the Order of the Crown (Netherlands)
Grand Crosses of the Order of the Crown (Netherlands)
Bruneian women